The men's 400 metre breaststroke was a swimming event held as part of the swimming at the 1912 Summer Olympics programme. It was the second appearance of the event, which had been introduced (as the 440 yard breaststroke) in 1904. The competition was held from Monday July 8, 1912 to Friday July 12, 1912.

Seventeen swimmers from ten nations competed.

The final of the event was a rematch between the five swimmers who had competed in the final of the 200 metre race. Bathe won once again (and indeed, set a new Olympic record each time he raced in both breaststroke events), with Henning providing a stiff challenge in the semifinals. Neither Lützow nor Malisch were able to medal in the longer race, as Henning took silver and Courtman finished third.

Records

These were the standing world and Olympic records (in minutes) prior to the 1912 Summer Olympics.

(*) 440 yards (= 402.34 m)

In the first heat Thor Henning set a new Olympic record with 6:52.4 minutes. Only to be improved in the second heat by Paul Malisch who swam 6:47.0 minutes. In the fourth heat Percy Courtman improved the Olympic record with 6:43.8 minutes. And again one heat later in the fifth run Walter Bathe swam 6:34.6. In the first semi-final Bathe and Henning bettered the record with 6:32.0 minutes. Bathe was able to improve the record in the final with 6:29.6 minutes.

Results

Quarterfinals

Monday July 8, 1912: The top two in each heat advanced along with the fastest loser overall.

Quarterfinal 1

Oszkár Demján was disqualified, because he touched the wall with only one hand at the second turn.

Quarterfinal 2

Quarterfinal 3

Quarterfinal 4

Quarterfinal 5

Semifinals

Thursday July 11, 1912: The top two from each heat and the faster of the two third place swimmers advanced.

Semifinal 1

Semifinal 2

Final

Friday July 12, 1912:

References

Notes
 
 

Swimming at the 1912 Summer Olympics
Men's events at the 1912 Summer Olympics